A summary of these results can be found at 2011 Guildford Council election

Results

References

2011 full results
2011 English local elections
2010s in Surrey